The Shopian rape and murder case, also known as Asiya, Neelofar case, is the abduction, rape and murder of two young women allegedly by the Indian Army. In mysterious circumstances between 29 and 30 May 2009 at Bongam, Shopian district in the Indian state of Jammu and Kashmir. Two women who were sisters-in-law went missing from their orchard on the way home on 29 May 2009. The next day morning, their bodies were found both one kilometer apart. Local police rejected the allegations saying that the women appeared to have drowned in a stream.

Victims

Neelofar Jan, aged 22 and Aasiya Jan, aged 17 were sisters-in-law and resided in Bongam, Shopian. Neelofar Jan was married to Shakeel Ahmed Ahangar and the couple had a two-year-old son. Aasiya Jan was the daughter of Abdul Gani Ahangar. She had secured a distinction in her matriculation exams in the year preceding her death.[42]

Initial stages of investigations
Local villagers stated that the two women were raped and the murdered by members of security forces. A protest called by Syed Ali Shah Geelani of the Hurriyat called for a shutdown of business, but later turned violent, as a consequence of which the administration declared a curfew. A press release by the police on 30 May stated "Post-mortem conducted revealed no marks on the dead bodies including private parts." No FIR was registered for either rape or murder and the government of Jammu and Kashmir ordered for a judicial probe by Justice Muzaffar Jan into the incident because of people's lack of faith in police investigations. Concerns arose after the doctor who conducted the post-mortem admitted to the Central Bureau of Investigation that the vaginal swabs that she had submitted to them for testing were fabricated from discarded lab items, and that she had not taken any swabs from the victims. Later, testing by the Central Forensic Laboratory proved that the samples submitted after post-mortem did not match the victims.

On 7 June 2009, Jammu and Kashmir police filed FIR of rape and murder following widespread protest across the state.

Case history
While on 31 May 2009, the Chief Minister of Jammu and Kashmir, Omar Abdullah, appointed Muzaffar Jan to carry out the probe and complete the inquiry in one month's time. The Superintendent of Police, Dr Haseeb Mughal, and The Chief Prosecuting Officer, Abdul Majid Dar, were to assist in the probe, headed by Justice (retired) Muzaffar Jan. The report would be subsequently tabled in the state assembly to make it public. The notification issued in this regard by the Home Department said that the Commission shall:
 ascertain whether there had been any foul play in their death and, if so, identify the person/persons responsible.
 perform all other functions necessary for holding of inquiry and submit its report within one month from the date of the notification.
 ascertain whether there was any failure on the part of any government department in the conduct of any investigation or handling of the post-incident situation.
 The Commission, appointed in exercise of powers conferred by Section 3 of the J&K Commission of Inquiry Act, shall recommend action as deemed necessary against the person/persons involved/responsible and suggest action as may be necessary to ensure non-repetition of such incidents.
The government has further directed that the provisions of sub-section 2, 3, 4, 5 and 6 of Section 5 of Commission of Inquiry Act shall be applicable to the Commission.

Outcome of Justice Jan commission
The final report filed by Justice Jan Commission is summarised in seven parts.
 Part 1
 Part 2
 Part 3
 Part 4
 Part 5
 Part 6
 Part 7

Timeline of probe and police findings and fact-finding committee

Rejection of probe
The High Court Bar Association, on 1 June 2009, rejected the probe ordered by the government demanding a sitting Judge of High Court or Chief Justice to carry out the probe instead of a retired Justice, Muzaffar Jan, while separatist leader Syed Ali Shah Geelani demanded Amnesty International to probe the incident and also urged the High Court Bar Association to probe the matter at their own level so that the people could know the truth.
However, the Advocate General of Jammu and Kashmir, Muhammad Ishaq Qadri commented that the Commission of Inquiry headed by a sitting or a retired judge does not make any difference regarding the legality of its findings, which are recommendatory in nature in both the cases.
Unionist leader of the opposition in the assembly and the PDP president, Mahbooba Mufti, also rejected the government's inquiry commission into the case, and called upon the prime minister, Dr. Manmohan Singh, to review the performance of the state's ruling coalition personally as according to her, it had failed to extent of not registering an FIR of rape and murder in the case.

Protests, arrests and curfew
As soon as the news about the incident spread in the Kashmir valley, spontaneous protests started. These protests were followed by the strike call by the secessionist leaders. Demands for justice, self-determination and removal of the Indian forces started. As soon as the protests started, police and Indian armed forces in order to halt the protests batten charged the protesters and fired repeated tear gas canisters. Many separatist leaders were put under house arrest or jailed. The CBI probe resulted in exhuming the bodies for examination and it was found that Asiya's hymen was intact, thereby ruling out rape.

Curfew

See also
 1998 Ajmer serial gang rapes case
 Rape in Kashmir Conflict
 Zakoora and Tengpora massacre
 Gawakadal massacre
 Sopore massacre
 Kathua Rape Case
Love jihad
Sexual jihad
Brides of ISIL
Rape in India

References

 

42.^https://www.greaterkashmir.com/news/more/news/greenland-school-loses-its-topper/

External links
 Militarisation with Impunity: A Brief on Rape and Murder in Shopian, Kashmir, a report by an NGO called International People's Tribunal on Human Rights and Justice in Kashmir

2009 crimes in India
Human rights abuses in Jammu and Kashmir
Rape in India
Murder in India
Sex crimes in India
2000s in Jammu and Kashmir
Incidents of violence against girls